Christia is a given name. Notable people with the name include:

Christia Adair
Christia Brown
Christia Mercer, American professor of philosophy at Columbia University
Christia Sylf (1924–1980), French writer
Christia Visser (born 1992), South African actress and singer

See also
Christy (disambiguation)
Christie (disambiguation)